Norma Ojeda Furlong is a writer, journalist and former Mexican actress and singer.

Sister of the singer Oscar Athie, she started her career in 1968 in the Mexican T.V show La hora de Raúl Astor. Her first role in a telenovela was in 1973. In the 1970s and 1980s, starred in many Mexican films and telenovelas as Mi pequeña Soledad (1990) with Verónica Castro and Muchachitas (1991). Her last t.v role was in Al norte del corazón in 1997.

July began a writer and journalist career in 1992. In 2000 write her first political book Testiminios de fin de siglo.

Films

 Mi nombre es Sergio, soy alcohólico (1981)
 Chin Chin el Teporocho (1976)
 Un amor extraño (1975)
 Besos, besos... y más besos (1973)
 Lux aexterna (1973)
 Ya sé quién eres (te he estado observando) (1971)
 El cielo y tú (1971)
 Más allá de la violencia (1971)
 El paletero (1971)
 La agonía de ser madre (1970)
 Las chicas malas del Padre Méndez (1970)
 La guerra de las monjas (1970)
 Los problemas de mamá (1970)
 La puerta y la mujer del carnicero (1968)
 Esta noche sí (1968)

Telenovelas

 Al norte del corazón (1997) .... Marcela
 Con toda el alma'''' (1996) .... Doctora Muchachitas (1991) .... Verónica Sánchez Zúñiga #1 Mi pequeña Soledad (1990) .... Natalia Ave Fenix (1986) .... Cristina Principessa (1984) .... Elina Guadalupe (1984) .... Sara Por amor (1982) .... Marcia Cancionera (1980) .... Paloma La llama de tu amor (1979)
 Humillados y ofendidos.... (1977)
 Ven conmigo.... (1975) .... Vicky Paloma.... (1975) .... Isabel La hiena (1973) .... Rosaura El edificio de enfrente (1972)
 El amor tiene cara de mujer (1971) .... Cristina Velo de Novia (1971)

TV shows

 Mujer, casos de la vida real'' (1994)
 Miércoles a go-go
 Orfeón a go-go
 La hora de Raúl Astor

References

External links

Living people
Mexican film actresses
Mexican telenovela actresses
Mexican television actresses
Mexican journalists
Actresses from Mexico City
Singers from Mexico City
Mexican people of Irish descent
Year of birth missing (living people)